The Kawasaki ZR-7 (and ZR-7S), (ZR750-H1 through ZR750-H5) is a standard motorcycle manufactured by the Japanese motorcycle manufacturer Kawasaki. It was sold in the United States from 1999 through 2003, and sold in a few other countries through the 2005 model year. The major differences between the ZR-7 and the ZR-7S models were the "S" model's fairing and associated headlight and instrument cluster, and stiffer fork springs. Both models are powered by an inline 4-cylinder 4-stroke, double-overhead-cam DOHC air-and-oil-cooled 738 cc engine, generating 57 kW and 63 N·m. Carburetors are four constant-velocity (CV) Keihin CVK 32 mm. Final drive is via chain; the transmission is a 5-speed (equipped with positive neutral finder), coupled with a wet clutch. Seat height is 800 mm. The ZR-7S has an advertised dry weight of 210 kg. The ZR-7 has a wet mass of 231 kg.

Specifications:

References

External links

ZR-7
Standard motorcycles
Motorcycles introduced in 1999